Mykola Chaban is a Soviet and Ukrainian journalist, a Ukrainian prose writer, specialist in regional studies of Dnipropetrovsk region. He is a Merited Journalist of Ukraine (2007).

Mykola Chaban was born in Dnipropetrovsk on 5 March 1958. He graduated from the Faculty of Ukrainian Philology at the Dnipropetrovsk State University (specialization - "Ukrainian language and literature"). Since then Chaban worked in newspapers of Dniprodzerzhynsk and Dnipropetrovsk. Currently he works at a Dnipropetrovsk regional newspaper "Zoria" as an editor on cultural issues.

Membership
 National Writers Union of Ukraine
 All-Ukrainian Union of regional researchers
 International Association of Belarusian Studies

Awards
 Valerian Pidmohylny National Writers Union of Ukraine Award (2004)
 Khoroshun Award (1993)
 Dmytro Yavornytsky honorary diploma (1994) for the book "Sicheslav in heart"
 Person of the Year (Dniprodzerzhynsk 1995) as journalist
 Honors of Mayor of Dniprodzerzhynsk (2004) for the book "Journey through old Kamianske"
 Laureate of year by the periodical "Courier of Kryvbas" (1994, 1995)

External links
 Profile at the Literary Dnipropetrovsk Land
 Profile at the Dnipropetrovsk region library (cached)
 In Dnipropetrovsk was presented a book about one of the most mysterious writers. Radio Svoboda. January 14, 2013.
 Ratsybarska, Yu. In Dnipropetrovsk honoring memory of the Ukrainian People's Republic warriors. "Radio Svoboda". January 4, 2013.
 Interview of Mykola Chaban to a local TV channel
 Same interview from the original source

1958 births
Writers from Dnipro
20th-century Ukrainian historians
20th-century Ukrainian journalists
Oles Honchar Dnipro National University alumni
Living people
21st-century Ukrainian journalists
21st-century Ukrainian historians